The Parson Barnard House is a historic late-First Period house at 179 Osgood Street in North Andover, Massachusetts. The -story wood-frame house was built in 1715 by Parson Thomas Barnard after his previous house burned down. The house is one of the most important First Period houses in New England, due its unique, transitional features and excellent state of preservation. For many years it was believed to be the home of colonial governor Simon Bradstreet and his wife Anne.

The house was purchased in 1950 by the North Andover Historical Society, and is open for tours seasonally.  The property also includes a late 18th-century carriage house.  It was listed on the National Register of Historic Places in 1974, and included in the North Andover Center Historic District in 1979.

See also
 National Register of Historic Places listings in Essex County, Massachusetts
 List of the oldest buildings in Massachusetts

References

External links

 North Andover Historical Society

Houses in North Andover, Massachusetts
Museums in Essex County, Massachusetts
Historic house museums in Massachusetts
Houses on the National Register of Historic Places in Essex County, Massachusetts
Historic district contributing properties in Massachusetts